Siegfried Seibold (born 12 August 1959) is a German wrestler. He competed in the men's Greco-Roman 82 kg at the 1984 Summer Olympics.

References

External links
 

1959 births
Living people
German male sport wrestlers
Olympic wrestlers of West Germany
Wrestlers at the 1984 Summer Olympics
People from Bad Reichenhall
Sportspeople from Upper Bavaria